9500 to:
The year 9500, in the 10th millennium.
9500 Camelot, an asteroid belt
ATI Radeon 9500, a computer graphics card series
NVIDIA GeForce 9500, a computer graphics card series
Nokia 9500 Communicator, a smartphone